Daitari Behera (1 July 1938 – 2 January 2020) was an Indian politician from Odisha belonging to Indian National Congress. He was elected as a legislator of the Odisha Legislative Assembly two times.

Biography
Behera was born on 1 July 1938. He was elected as a member of the Odisha Legislative Assembly from Chhatrapur in 1974. He was also elected from this constituency in 1995.

Behera died on 2 January 2020 at the age of 81.

References

1938 births
2020 deaths
Indian National Congress politicians from Odisha
People from Ganjam district
Members of the Odisha Legislative Assembly